The 1981 Winter Universiade, the X Winter Universiade, took place in Jaca, Spain.

Medal table

1981
Universiade
Uni
Multi-sport events in Spain
Winter Universiade
Sport in Aragon
Winter Universiade
Winter Universiade
Winter sports competitions in Spain